Maksima Gorkogo is a rural locality (a settlement) in Krasnooktyabrskoye Rural Settlement, Sredneakhtubinsky District, Volgograd Oblast, Russia. The population was 367 as of 2010.

References 

Rural localities in Sredneakhtubinsky District